The Pinnebog River is a  river in the Thumb region of the U.S. state of Michigan. The river flows into Lake Huron on the west side of the "tip" of the "thumb".

The entire length of the Pinnebog lies within Huron County and is fed by various agricultural ditches and drains. It flows southwest for about  around the unincorporated community of Popple where it is fed by the Cameron and McLean drains. It then bends northward around Popple and flows northwest for about  past the east side of the village of Elkton. Other tributaries include the Elkton Drain, Nettle Run, Hill Drain, Southworth Drain, McMullen Drain, Oliver Drain, Bad Axe Creek, Musselman Drain (which empties Rush Lake in the Rush Lake State Game Area. Just before its mouth, it is joined by the Taft and Schram drains.

The river's watershed drains all or portions of the following townships: 
Bingham, 
Chandler, 
Colfax, 
Dwight,
Hume, 
Lake, 
Lincoln, 
Meade, 
Oliver, 
Sheridan, and 
Verona.

The unincorporated community of Pinnebog is situated on the Taft Drain. Pinnebog Road is also designated as County Road L for its entire length.

See also
List of rivers of Michigan

References

External links
Port Crescent State Park website

Rivers of Michigan
Rivers of Huron County, Michigan
Tributaries of Lake Huron